Dušan Popović (15 June 1970 – 18 November 2011) was a Serbian water polo player. In his career, he played for VK Partizan 
and Posillipo. He played for the Yugoslav and Serbian national teams.

See also
 List of world champions in men's water polo
 List of World Aquatics Championships medalists in water polo

References

External links
 

1970 births
2011 deaths
Serbian male water polo players
World Aquatics Championships medalists in water polo
Mediterranean Games silver medalists for Yugoslavia
Competitors at the 1991 Mediterranean Games
Mediterranean Games medalists in water polo